Manfred Chabinga (born 6 November 1965) is a Zambian footballer. He competed in the men's tournament at the 1988 Summer Olympics.

References

1965 births
Living people
Zambian footballers
Zambia international footballers
Olympic footballers of Zambia
Footballers at the 1988 Summer Olympics
Place of birth missing (living people)
Association football defenders
Nchanga Rangers F.C. players